Atwoods Brook is a community in the Canadian province of Nova Scotia, located in the Barrington municipal district of Shelburne County.

See also
 List of communities in Nova Scotia

References

External links
Atwoods Brook on Destination Nova Scotia

Communities in Shelburne County, Nova Scotia